009 may refer to:

 OO9, gauge model railways
 O09, FAA identifier for Round Valley Airport
 0O9, FAA identifier for Ward Field, see List of airports in California
 British secret agent 009, see 00 Agent
 BA 009, see British Airways Flight 9
 Guantanamo detainee 009, Yaser Esam Hamdi
 Zeekr 009, an all-electric luxury minivan

See also
 Cyborg 009, a 1964 manga
 009-1, a 2006 anime
 Junkers EF 009, a jetfighter
 009 Sound System, a songwriting project by Alexander Perls